Since 1850, more than 5,000 people have gone over Niagara Falls, either intentionally (as stunts or suicide attempts) or accidentally. The first recorded person to survive going over the falls was school teacher Annie Edson Taylor, who in 1901 successfully completed the stunt inside an oak barrel. In the following  years, thousands of people have been swept over the falls but only sixteen people have reportedly survived the feat. All instances of people having survived the trip over the falls have been over the Canadian Horseshoe Falls. Following the death of one daredevil in 1951, stunting at Niagara Falls has been illegal and subject to fines of up to $25,000 USD.

History 
A number of people have gained notability by their stunts, both successful and fatal. The first documented survival of a trip over Niagara Falls was that of school teacher Annie Edson Taylor in 1901. Taylor went over the falls in an oak barrel as part of a stunt in an attempt to bring her financial security. Other daredevil attempts have been made by Bobby Leach, Charles Stephens, Jean Lussier, Karel Soucek, and Steve Trotter. In 1903, baseball Hall of Famer Ed Delahanty died after accidentally going over the falls while intoxicated. Following the death of daredevil William "Red" Hill, Jr. in 1951, Ontario Premier Leslie Frost issued an order to the Niagara Parks Commission to arrest anyone found to be performing stunts at the falls. Both Canadian and American authorities began to issue fines for daredevils at the falls; as of 2011, the fines are $10,000 CAD (approximately $7,700 USD) in Canada, or $25,000 USD (approximately $32,800 CAD) in the United States.

When the American Falls was temporarily diverted in 1969, two bodies were found; the identities were not disclosed. There have been no recorded cases of people surviving the trip over the American Falls.

Statistics 
An estimated 5,000 bodies were found at the foot of the falls between 1850 and 2011. On average, between 20 and 30 people die going over the falls each year. The majority of deaths are suicides, and most take place from the Canadian Horseshoe Falls. Many of these suicides are not publicized by officials.

Mortality rate for the daredevil attempts over the falls is approximately 25%.

Incidents

Footnotes

References

External links

Gone over Niagara Falls